Magazia may refer to several places:

 Magazia, a village in Răchitoasa Commune, Bacău County, Romania
 Magazia, a village in Crăcăoani Commune, Neamţ County, Romania
Magazia, Paxoi, a village in the island Paxoi, Greece